Robert Boutigny (24 July 1927 – 22 July 2022) was a French sprint canoeist who competed from the late 1940s to the early 1950s. Competing in two Summer Olympics, he won a bronze medal in the C-1 1000 m event at London in 1948. Boutigny also won two medals at the 1950 ICF Canoe Sprint World Championships with a gold in the C-1 10000 m and a silver in the C-1 1000 m events.

References

External links

Robert Boutigny's profile at Sports Reference.com

1927 births
2022 deaths
People from Villeneuve-le-Roi
Canoeists at the 1948 Summer Olympics
Canoeists at the 1952 Summer Olympics
French male canoeists
Olympic canoeists of France
Olympic bronze medalists for France
Olympic medalists in canoeing
ICF Canoe Sprint World Championships medalists in Canadian
Medalists at the 1948 Summer Olympics